Harpalus miles is a species of ground beetle in the subfamily Harpalinae. It was described by Peringuey in 1896.

References

miles
Beetles described in 1896